Campagna Lupia is a town in the province of Venice, Veneto, north-eastern Italy.

Sources
(Google Maps)

References

Cities and towns in Veneto